Abdollahabad (also Romanized as ʿAbdollahābād) is a village in Tameshkol Rural District, Nashta District, Tonekabon County, Mazandaran Province, Iran. At the 2006 census, its population was 283, in 76 families.

References 

Populated places in Tonekabon County